Lakeview is an unincorporated predominantly African American community in the Carrier Mills township, Saline County, Illinois, United States. Lakeview was originally called "The Pond Settlement." It was named after the Cypress swampland and wetlands that surrounds the area of Carrier Mills. It is one of the oldest settlements in Illinois, and holds the oldest predominantly African American cemetery in Illinois. Similar to the Maroon Communities in Louisiana, it is the oldest community in Illinois founded by runaway slaves. The community is drained by the Saline River

Lakeview was established as a Freedmen's town by a group of African-American Runaway Slaves and freedmen who migrated from North Carolina shortly after the War of 1812. They arrived between 1818 and 1820. This area had been ideal for the Native Americans who had lived, hunted, fished, and farmed this region. Around 1800, however, most of the Native American families there had contracted Small Pox and were all but wiped out. According to one account, only 13 Native American families remained and they welcomed the freedmen with open arms.

Census records indicate that the first settlers were the Allen, Blackwell, Taborn, Mitchell, Evans, Cofield, and Cole Families. These earliest Lakeview residents were mostly self-sufficient. They depended on a mixture of hunting and farming for their food. The early families had substantial land holdings in the Pre-Civil War era. It was only after the village of Morrillsville, later known as Carrier Mills, was established that some of these holdings were sold off. Whites continued to buy land around Lakeview during the remainder of the nineteenth century, resulting in the breakup of the larger land holdings.

Lakeview had its own school and grocery store along with many homes. In 1850, a Union Church was established near Carrier Mills in Saline County. Most members were either Baptist or Methodist. An African Methodist Episcopal Church was organized at the home of Irvin Allen, who then built a one-room log church building on his property. Later they organized and built a frame structure on the M. Taylor farm. After the church burned they rebuilt and moved the church to Carrier Mills where it sits today. This congregation is now Baber Chapel AME Church. The Lakeview cemetery, founded in 1838, has become a state historical landmark. The area of Lakeview is still nearly 100% black. After the closing of the Lakeview school in the 1950s, many people moved to the east side of Carrier Mills. Descendants of Lakeview have continued to hold an annual community reunion at the cemetery on Memorial Day for decades, a tradition dating to the 19th century.
 
Deputy Royce E. Cline was the only police officer to die in the line of duty in Saline County. He was shot and killed by a suspected bootlegger in the "pond settlement" on Friday, August 14, 1925.

See also
Harrisburg, Illinois
Carrier Mills, Illinois

References

External links

Unincorporated communities in Saline County, Illinois
Unincorporated communities in Illinois
Populated places established in 1818
African-American historic places